Kathleen McCartney may refer to:

Kathleen McCartney (college president) (born 1956), president of Smith College
Kathleen McCartney Hearst, triathlete